Maxwell Brown may refer to:

Maxwell Brown (baseball) (born 1993), New Zealand baseball outfielder
Maxwell Brown (politician) (died 2012), Australian politician 
Maxwell Brown (novelist) (19162003), Australian novelist and journalist 
Maxwell Brown (tennis) in 1958 U.S. National Championships – Men's Singles

See also
Max Brown (disambiguation)